The freguesias (civil parishes) of Portugal are listed in by municipality according to the following format:
 concelho
 freguesias

Idanha-a-Nova
Alcafozes
Aldeia de Santa Margarida
Idanha-a-Nova
Idanha-a-Velha
Ladoeiro
Medelim
Monfortinho
Monsanto
Oledo
Penha Garcia
Proença-a-Velha
Rosmaninhal
Salvaterra do Extremo
São Miguel de Acha
Segura
Toulões
Zebreira

Ílhavo
Gafanha da Encarnação
Gafanha da Nazaré
Gafanha do Carmo
Ílhavo (São Salvador)

I